Kastoria F.C. or AS Kastoria 1980, the Athletic Club Kastoria 1980, is a Greek association football club based in the city of Kastoria, Macedonia, Greece.

History
The club was established in 1963 when three local football clubs (Aris, Atromitos and Orestias) merged to form one stronger team representing the town. In 1974, Kastoria played for the first time in the A' Ethniki of the Greek National League. Kastoria have played in the A' Division from 1974–1983 and again in season 1996-1997.

Kastoria FC won the Greek Cup in 1980 by defeating Iraklis.

Honours
Greek Cup
 Winners 1: 1979–80
 Second Division Champions: 1
 1973–74
 Third Division Champions: 2
 1994–95, 2003–04
 FCA Kastoria Champions: 3
 2012–13, 2016–17, 2021-22
 FCA Kastoria Cup Winners: 3
 2000–01, 2001–02, 2016–17

League history
Sources:

European matches

Notable players
 Kiriakos Karataidis
 Antonis Minou
 Georgios Paraschos
 Nikos Sarganis
 Ioannis Dintsikos

Logos

References

External links
 Unofficial Team Webpage
 Municipal Stadium of Kastoria

Kastoria
Football clubs in Western Macedonia
Association football clubs established in 1963
1963 establishments in Greece